"Victorious" is a song by Swedish singer Lina Hedlund. The song was performed for the first time in Melodifestivalen 2019, where it made it to the final. This was Hedlund's first Melodifestivalen solo entry since 2003 with "Nothing Can Stop Me".

Charts

References

2019 singles
English-language Swedish songs
Melodifestivalen songs of 2019
Swedish pop songs
Songs written by Dotter (singer)
2019 songs